The 1971 Iowa Hawkeyes football team represented the University of Iowa in the 1971 Big Ten Conference football season. This was Frank Lauterbur's first year as head coach of the Hawkeyes, and the last season for Iowa's home football venue to be called "Iowa Stadium". It would be renamed "Nile Kinnick Stadium" as of the 9/23/72 home opener, named for Iowa's only Heisman Trophy winner, Nile Kinnick.

Schedule

Roster

References

Iowa
Iowa Hawkeyes football seasons
Iowa Hawkeyes football